Woodlynde School is a KG–12 private, co-educational college-preparatory day school for students with learning differences in Strafford, Pennsylvania, United States. It was established in 1976.

References

External links 
 

Private elementary schools in Pennsylvania
Private middle schools in Pennsylvania
Private high schools in Pennsylvania
Schools in Delaware County, Pennsylvania
Preparatory schools in Pennsylvania
Educational institutions established in 1976
1976 establishments in Pennsylvania